July 21 - Eastern Orthodox Church calendar - July 23

All fixed commemorations below are celebrated on August 4 by Old Calendar.

For July 22nd, Orthodox Churches on the Old Calendar commemorate the Saints listed on July 9.

Saints
 Holy Myrrh-bearer and Equal-to-the-Apostles Mary Magdalene (1st century)  (see also: May 4)
 Saint Cyril I, Patriarch of Antioch (298)

Pre-Schism Western saints
 Saint Pancharius (Pancratius), Bishop of Besançon in France, he suffered much under the Arian Emperor Constantius (c. 356)
 Saint Movean (Biteus), a disciple of St Patrick and Abbot of Inis-Coosery in Co. Down in Ireland, he also lived in Perthshire in Scotland where he reposed as a hermit.
 Saint Dabius (Davius), a priest from Ireland who preached in Scotland, where churches are dedicated to him.
 Saint Wandregisilus of Caux, Gaul (668)
 Venerable Meneleus (Ménélé, Mauvier), a monk at Carméry in Auvergne, later restoring the monastery of Menat near Clermont (c. 720)

Post-Schism Orthodox saints
 Virgin-martyr Markella of Chios (14th century)
 Blessed Cyprian of Suzdal, Fool-for-Christ (1622)
 Venerable Cornelius of Pereyaslavl, monk, father-confessor of Alexandrov Convent (1693)

New martyrs and confessors
 New Hieromartyr Michael Nakaryakov, Priest (1918)
 New Hieromartyr Alexis Ilinsky, Priest (1931)

Other commemorations
 Translation of the relics (403-404) of Hieromartyr Phocas, Bishop of Sinope (117)  (see also: July 23, September 22)

Icon gallery

Notes

References

Sources
 July 22/August 4. Orthodox Calendar (PRAVOSLAVIE.RU).
 August 4 / July 22. HOLY TRINITY RUSSIAN ORTHODOX CHURCH (A parish of the Patriarchate of Moscow).
 July 22. OCA - The Lives of the Saints.
 July 22. The Year of Our Salvation - Holy Transfiguration Monastery, Brookline, Massachusetts. 
 The Autonomous Orthodox Metropolia of Western Europe and the Americas (ROCOR). St. Hilarion Calendar of Saints for the year of our Lord 2004. St. Hilarion Press (Austin, TX). p. 54.
 The Twenty-Second Day of the Month of July. Orthodoxy in China.
 July 22. Latin Saints of the Orthodox Patriarchate of Rome.
 The Roman Martyrology. Transl. by the Archbishop of Baltimore. Last Edition, According to the Copy Printed at Rome in 1914. Revised Edition, with the Imprimatur of His Eminence Cardinal Gibbons. Baltimore: John Murphy Company, 1916. pp. 216–217.
 Rev. Richard Stanton. A Menology of England and Wales, or, Brief Memorials of the Ancient British and English Saints Arranged According to the Calendar, Together with the Martyrs of the 16th and 17th Centuries. London: Burns & Oates, 1892. pp. 351–352.

 Greek Sources
 Great Synaxaristes:  22 ΙΟΥΛΙΟΥ. ΜΕΓΑΣ ΣΥΝΑΞΑΡΙΣΤΗΣ.
  Συναξαριστής. 22 Ιουλίου. ECCLESIA.GR. (H ΕΚΚΛΗΣΙΑ ΤΗΣ ΕΛΛΑΔΟΣ). 
  22/07/. Ορθόδοξος Συναξαριστής.

 Russian Sources
  4 августа (22 июля). Православная Энциклопедия под редакцией Патриарха Московского и всея Руси Кирилла (электронная версия). (Orthodox Encyclopedia - Pravenc.ru).
  22 июля по старому стилю / 4 августа по новому стилю. СПЖ "Союз православных журналистов". .
  22 июля (ст.ст.) 4 августа  (нов. ст.). Русская Православная Церковь Отдел внешних церковных связей. (DECR).

July in the Eastern Orthodox calendar